The Sleight Baronetcy, of Weelsby Hall in Clee in the County of Lincoln, is a title in the Baronetage of the United Kingdom. It was created on 29 June 1920 for the fishing magnate George Sleight. The second Baronet was high sheriff and a justice of the peace and deputy lieutenant for Lincolnshire.

Sleight baronets, of Weelsby Hall (1920)
Sir George Frederick Sleight, 1st Baronet (1853–1921)
Sir Ernest Sleight, 2nd Baronet (1873–1946)
Sir John Frederick Sleight, 3rd Baronet (1909–1990)
Sir Richard Sleight, 4th Baronet (born 1946)

References
Kidd, Charles, Williamson, David (editors). Debrett's Peerage and Baronetage (1990 edition). New York: St Martin's Press, 1990.

Sleight